Ceratrichia semlikensis is a species of butterfly in the family Hesperiidae. It is found in the Republic of the Congo, the central part of the Democratic Republic of the Congo, the Central African Republic, Uganda, western Kenya, Tanzania and north-western Zambia. Their habitat consists of forests.

The larvae feed on Isachne mauritiana.

References

Butterflies described in 1921
Hesperiinae